Joseph Obinna Metu  (born 12 July 1988, Ogidi) is a Nigerian sprinter who specializes in the 100 metres. His personal best time is 10.11 seconds, achieved in June 2012 in Calabar.

He finished eighth at the 2006 World Junior Championships. At the 2007 All-Africa Games he won a bronze medal in the 200 metres and a gold medal in the 4x100 metres relay. At the 2008 Summer Olympics in Beijing he competed at the 100 metres sprint and placed 2nd in his heat after Francis Obikwelu in a time of 10.34 seconds. He improved his time to 10.29 seconds for the next round, but his time was only the 6th time of the heat and he was eliminated. Together with Onyeabor Ngwogu, Chinedu Oriala and Uchenna Emedolu he also competed at the 4x100 metres relay. In their qualification heat they did not finish due to a mistake in the baton exchange and they were eliminated. He also took part in the 200 metres individual, finishing first in his first round heat, with a time of 20.62 seconds. With 20.65 seconds in the second round he only placed sixth in his heat, which was not enough to qualify for the semi finals.  He competed at the 2012 Summer Olympics and the 2014 Commonwealth Games.

References

External links 
 
 

1988 births
Living people
Nigerian male sprinters
Igbo sportspeople
Olympic athletes of Nigeria
Athletes (track and field) at the 2008 Summer Olympics
Athletes (track and field) at the 2012 Summer Olympics
Athletes (track and field) at the 2014 Commonwealth Games
Commonwealth Games competitors for Nigeria
African Games gold medalists for Nigeria
African Games medalists in athletics (track and field)
People from Anambra State
African Games bronze medalists for Nigeria
Athletes (track and field) at the 2007 All-Africa Games
Athletes (track and field) at the 2011 All-Africa Games